Magnetic resonance imaging (MRI) is a medical imaging technique used in radiology to form pictures of the anatomy and the physiological processes of the body. MRI scanners use strong magnetic fields, magnetic field gradients, and radio waves to generate images of the organs in the body. MRI does not involve X-rays or the use of ionizing radiation, which distinguishes it from CT and PET scans. MRI is a medical application of nuclear magnetic resonance (NMR) which can also be used for imaging in other NMR applications, such as NMR spectroscopy.

MRI is widely used in hospitals and clinics for medical diagnosis, staging and follow-up of disease. Compared to CT, MRI provides better contrast in images of soft-tissues, e.g. in the brain or abdomen. However, it may be perceived as less comfortable by patients, due to the usually longer and louder measurements with the subject in a long, confining tube, though "Open" MRI designs mostly relieve this. Additionally, implants and other non-removable metal in the body can pose a risk and may exclude some patients from undergoing an MRI examination safely.

MRI was originally called NMRI (nuclear magnetic resonance imaging), but "nuclear" was dropped to avoid negative associations. Certain atomic nuclei are able to absorb radio frequency energy when placed in an external magnetic field; the resultant evolving spin polarization can induce a RF signal in a radio frequency coil and thereby be detected. In clinical and research MRI, hydrogen atoms are most often used to generate a macroscopic polarization that is detected by antennas close to the subject being examined. Hydrogen atoms are naturally abundant in humans and other biological organisms, particularly in water and fat. For this reason, most MRI scans essentially map the location of water and fat in the body. Pulses of radio waves excite the nuclear spin energy transition, and magnetic field gradients localize the polarization in space. By varying the parameters of the pulse sequence, different contrasts may be generated between tissues based on the relaxation properties of the hydrogen atoms therein.

Since its development in the 1970s and 1980s, MRI has proven to be a versatile imaging technique. While MRI is most prominently used in diagnostic medicine and biomedical research, it also may be used to form images of non-living objects, such as mummies. Diffusion MRI and functional MRI extend the utility of MRI to capture neuronal tracts and blood flow respectively in the nervous system, in addition to detailed spatial images. The sustained increase in demand for MRI within health systems has led to concerns about cost effectiveness and overdiagnosis.

Mechanism

Construction and physics

In most medical applications, hydrogen nuclei, which consist solely of a proton, that are in tissues create a signal that is processed to form an image of the body in terms of the density of those nuclei in a specific region. Given that the protons are affected by fields from other atoms to which they are bonded, it is possible to separate responses from hydrogen in specific compounds.
To perform a study, the person is positioned within an MRI scanner that forms a strong magnetic field around the area to be imaged. First, energy from an oscillating magnetic field is temporarily applied to the patient at the appropriate resonance frequency. Scanning with X and Y gradient coils causes a selected region of the patient to experience the exact magnetic field required for the energy to be absorbed. The atoms are excited by a radio frequency (RF) pulse and the resultant signal is measured by a receiving coil. The RF signal may be processed to deduce position information by looking at the changes in RF level and phase caused by varying the local magnetic field using gradient coils. As these coils are rapidly switched during the excitation and response to perform a moving line scan, they create the characteristic repetitive noise of an MRI scan as the windings move slightly due to magnetostriction. The contrast between different tissues is determined by the rate at which excited atoms return to the equilibrium state. Exogenous contrast agents may be given to the person to make the image clearer.

The major components of an MRI scanner are the main magnet, which polarizes the sample, the shim coils for correcting shifts in the homogeneity of the main magnetic field, the gradient system which is used to localize the region to be scanned and the RF system, which excites the sample and detects the resulting NMR signal. The whole system is controlled by one or more computers.

MRI requires a magnetic field that is both strong and uniform to a few parts per million across the scan volume. The field strength of the magnet is measured in teslas – and while the majority of systems operate at 1.5 T, commercial systems are available between 0.2 and 7 T. Whole-body MRI systems for research application operate in e.g. 9.4T, 10.5T, 11.7T. Even higher field whole-body MRI systems e.g. 14 T and beyond are in conceptual proposal or in engineering design. Most clinical magnets are superconducting magnets, which require liquid helium to keep them at low temperatures. Lower field strengths can be achieved with permanent magnets, which are often used in "open" MRI scanners for claustrophobic patients. Lower field strengths are also used in a portable MRI scanner approved by the FDA in 2020. Recently, MRI has been demonstrated also at ultra-low fields, i.e., in the microtesla-to-millitesla range, where sufficient signal quality is made possible by prepolarization (on the order of 10–100 mT) and by measuring the Larmor precession fields at about 100 microtesla with highly sensitive superconducting quantum interference devices (SQUIDs).

T1 and T2

Each tissue returns to its equilibrium state after excitation by the independent relaxation processes of T1 (spin-lattice; that is, magnetization in the same direction as the static magnetic field) and T2 (spin-spin; transverse to the static magnetic field).

To create a T1-weighted image, magnetization is allowed to recover before measuring the MR signal by changing the repetition time (TR). This image weighting is useful for assessing the cerebral cortex, identifying fatty tissue, characterizing focal liver lesions, and in general, obtaining morphological information, as well as for post-contrast imaging.

To create a T2-weighted image, magnetization is allowed to decay before measuring the MR signal by changing the echo time (TE). This image weighting is useful for detecting edema and inflammation, revealing white matter lesions, and assessing zonal anatomy in the prostate and uterus.

The standard display of MRI images is to represent fluid characteristics in black and white images, where different tissues turn out as follows:

Diagnostics

Usage by organ or system 

MRI has a wide range of applications in medical diagnosis and more than 25,000 scanners are estimated to be in use worldwide. MRI affects diagnosis and treatment in many specialties although the effect on improved health outcomes is disputed in certain cases.

MRI is the investigation of choice in the preoperative staging of rectal and prostate cancer and has a role in the diagnosis, staging, and follow-up of other tumors, as well as for determining areas of tissue for sampling in biobanking.

Neuroimaging 

MRI is the investigative tool of choice for neurological cancers over CT, as it offers better visualization of the posterior cranial fossa, containing the brainstem and the cerebellum. The contrast provided between grey and white matter makes MRI the best choice for many conditions of the central nervous system, including demyelinating diseases, dementia, cerebrovascular disease, infectious diseases, Alzheimer's disease and epilepsy. Since many images are taken milliseconds apart, it shows how the brain responds to different stimuli, enabling researchers to study both the functional and structural brain abnormalities in psychological disorders. MRI also is used in guided stereotactic surgery and radiosurgery for treatment of intracranial tumors, arteriovenous malformations, and other surgically treatable conditions using a device known as the N-localizer. New tools that implement artificial intelligence in healthcare have demonstrated higher image quality and morphometric analysis in neuroimaging with the application of a denoising system.

The record for the highest spatial resolution of a whole intact brain (postmortem) is 100 microns, from Massachusetts General Hospital. The data was published in NATURE on 30 October 2019.

Cardiovascular 

Cardiac MRI is complementary to other imaging techniques, such as echocardiography, cardiac CT, and nuclear medicine. It can be used to assess the structure and the function of the heart. Its applications include assessment of myocardial ischemia and viability, cardiomyopathies, myocarditis, iron overload, vascular diseases, and congenital heart disease.

Musculoskeletal 

Applications in the musculoskeletal system include spinal imaging, assessment of joint disease, and soft tissue tumors. Also, MRI techniques can be used for diagnostic imaging of
systemic muscle diseases including genetic muscle diseases.

Swallowing movement of throat and oesophagus can cause motion artifact over the imaged spine. Therefore, a saturation pulse applied over this region the throat and oesophagus can help to avoid this artifact. Motion artifact arising due to pumping of the heart can be reduced by timing the MRI pulse according to heart cycles. Blood vessels flow artifacts can be reduced by applying saturation pulses above and below the region of interest.

Liver and gastrointestinal 
Hepatobiliary MR is used to detect and characterize lesions of the liver, pancreas, and bile ducts. Focal or diffuse disorders of the liver may be evaluated using diffusion-weighted, opposed-phase imaging and dynamic contrast enhancement sequences. Extracellular contrast agents are used widely in liver MRI, and newer hepatobiliary contrast agents also provide the opportunity to perform functional biliary imaging. Anatomical imaging of the bile ducts is achieved by using a heavily T2-weighted sequence in magnetic resonance cholangiopancreatography (MRCP). Functional imaging of the pancreas is performed following administration of secretin. MR enterography provides non-invasive assessment of inflammatory bowel disease and small bowel tumors. MR-colonography may play a role in the detection of large polyps in patients at increased risk of colorectal cancer.

Angiography 

Magnetic resonance angiography (MRA) generates pictures of the arteries to evaluate them for stenosis (abnormal narrowing) or aneurysms (vessel wall dilatations, at risk of rupture). MRA is often used to evaluate the arteries of the neck and brain, the thoracic and abdominal aorta, the renal arteries, and the legs (called a "run-off"). A variety of techniques can be used to generate the pictures, such as administration of a paramagnetic contrast agent (gadolinium) or using a technique known as "flow-related enhancement" (e.g., 2D and 3D time-of-flight sequences), where most of the signal on an image is due to blood that recently moved into that plane (see also FLASH MRI).

Techniques involving phase accumulation (known as phase contrast angiography) can also be used to generate flow velocity maps easily and accurately. Magnetic resonance venography (MRV) is a similar procedure that is used to image veins. In this method, the tissue is now excited inferiorly, while the signal is gathered in the plane immediately superior to the excitation plane—thus imaging the venous blood that recently moved from the excited plane.

Contrast agents 
MRI for imaging anatomical structures or blood flow do not require contrast agents since the varying properties of the tissues or blood provide natural contrasts. However, for more specific types of imaging, exogenous contrast agents may be given intravenously, orally, or intra-articularly. Most contrast agents are either paramagnetic (e.g.: gadolinium, manganese, europium), and are used to shorten T1 in the tissue they accumulate in, or super-paramagnetic (SPIONs), and are used to shorten T2 and T2* in healthy tissue reducing its signal intensity (negative contrast agents). The most commonly used intravenous contrast agents are based on chelates of gadolinium, which is highly paramagnetic. In general, these agents have proved safer than the iodinated contrast agents used in X-ray radiography or CT. Anaphylactoid reactions are rare, occurring in approx. 0.03–0.1%. Of particular interest is the lower incidence of nephrotoxicity, compared with iodinated agents, when given at usual doses—this has made contrast-enhanced MRI scanning an option for patients with renal impairment, who would otherwise not be able to undergo contrast-enhanced CT.

Gadolinium-based contrast reagents are typically octadentate complexes of gadolinium(III). The complex is very stable (log K > 20) so that, in use, the concentration of the un-complexed Gd3+ ions should be below the toxicity limit. The 9th place in the metal ion's coordination sphere is occupied by a water molecule which exchanges rapidly with water molecules in the reagent molecule's immediate environment, affecting the magnetic resonance relaxation time. For details see MRI contrast agent.

In December 2017, the Food and Drug Administration (FDA) in the United States announced in a drug safety communication that new warnings were to be included on all gadolinium-based contrast agents (GBCAs). The FDA also called for increased patient education and requiring gadolinium contrast vendors to conduct additional animal and clinical studies to assess the safety of these agents.
Although gadolinium agents have proved useful for patients with kidney impairment, in patients with severe kidney failure requiring dialysis there is a risk of a rare but serious illness, nephrogenic systemic fibrosis, which may be linked to the use of certain gadolinium-containing agents. The most frequently linked is gadodiamide, but other agents have been linked too. Although a causal link has not been definitively established, current guidelines in the United States are that dialysis patients should only receive gadolinium agents where essential and that dialysis should be performed as soon as possible after the scan to remove the agent from the body promptly.

In Europe, where more gadolinium-containing agents are available, a classification of agents according to potential risks has been released. In 2008, a new contrast agent named gadoxetate, brand name Eovist (US) or Primovist (EU), was approved for diagnostic use: This has the theoretical benefit of a dual excretion path.

Sequences 

An MRI sequence is a particular setting of radiofrequency pulses and gradients, resulting in a particular image appearance. The T1 and T2 weighting can also be described as MRI sequences.

Other specialized configurations

Magnetic resonance spectroscopy 

Magnetic resonance spectroscopy (MRS) is used to measure the levels of different metabolites in body tissues, which can be achieved through a variety of single voxel or imaging-based techniques. The MR signal produces a spectrum of resonances that corresponds to different molecular arrangements of the isotope being "excited". This signature is used to diagnose certain metabolic disorders, especially those affecting the brain, and to provide information on tumor metabolism.

Magnetic resonance spectroscopic imaging (MRSI) combines both spectroscopic and imaging methods to produce spatially localized spectra from within the sample or patient. The spatial resolution is much lower (limited by the available SNR), but the spectra in each voxel contains information about many metabolites. Because the available signal is used to encode spatial and spectral information, MRSI requires high SNR achievable only at higher field strengths (3 T and above). The high procurement and maintenance costs of MRI with extremely high field strengths inhibit their popularity. However, recent compressed sensing-based software algorithms (e.g., SAMV) have been proposed to achieve super-resolution without requiring such high field strengths.

Real-time MRI 

Real-time MRI refers to the continuous imaging of moving objects (such as the heart) in real time. One of the many different strategies developed since the early 2000s is based on radial FLASH MRI, and iterative reconstruction. This gives a temporal resolution of 20–30 ms for images with an in-plane resolution of 1.5–2.0 mm. Balanced steady-state free precession (bSSFP) imaging has a better image contrast between the blood pool and myocardium than the FLASH MRI, yet it will produce severe banding artifact when the B0 inhomogeneity is strong. Real-time MRI is likely to add important information on diseases of the heart and the joints, and in many cases may make MRI examinations easier and more comfortable for patients, especially for the patients who cannot hold their breathings or who have arrhythmia.

Interventional MRI 

The lack of harmful effects on the patient and the operator make MRI well-suited for interventional radiology, where the images produced by an MRI scanner guide minimally invasive procedures. Such procedures use no ferromagnetic instruments.

A specialized growing subset of interventional MRI is intraoperative MRI, in which an MRI is used in surgery. Some specialized MRI systems allow imaging concurrent with the surgical procedure. More typically, the surgical procedure is temporarily interrupted so that MRI can assess the success of the procedure or guide subsequent surgical work.

Magnetic resonance guided focused ultrasound 
In guided therapy, high-intensity focused ultrasound (HIFU) beams are focused on a tissue, that are controlled using MR thermal imaging. Due to the high energy at the focus, the temperature rises to above 65 °C (150 °F) which completely destroys the tissue. This technology can achieve precise ablation of diseased tissue. MR imaging provides a three-dimensional view of the target tissue, allowing for the precise focusing of ultrasound energy. The MR imaging provides quantitative, real-time, thermal images of the treated area. This allows the physician to ensure that the temperature generated during each cycle of ultrasound energy is sufficient to cause thermal ablation within the desired tissue and if not, to adapt the parameters to ensure effective treatment.

Multinuclear imaging 

Hydrogen has the most frequently imaged nucleus in MRI because it is present in biological tissues in great abundance, and because its high gyromagnetic ratio gives a strong signal. However, any nucleus with a net nuclear spin could potentially be imaged with MRI. Such nuclei include helium-3, lithium-7, carbon-13, fluorine-19, oxygen-17, sodium-23, phosphorus-31 and xenon-129. 23Na and 31P are naturally abundant in the body, so they can be imaged directly. Gaseous isotopes such as 3He or 129Xe must be hyperpolarized and then inhaled as their nuclear density is too low to yield a useful signal under normal conditions. 17O and 19F can be administered in sufficient quantities in liquid form (e.g. 17O-water) that hyperpolarization is not a necessity. Using helium or xenon has the advantage of reduced background noise, and therefore increased contrast for the image itself, because these elements are not normally present in biological tissues.

Moreover, the nucleus of any atom that has a net nuclear spin and that is bonded to a hydrogen atom could potentially be imaged via heteronuclear magnetization transfer MRI that would image the high-gyromagnetic-ratio hydrogen nucleus instead of the low-gyromagnetic-ratio nucleus that is bonded to the hydrogen atom. In principle, heteronuclear magnetization transfer MRI could be used to detect the presence or absence of specific chemical bonds.

Multinuclear imaging is primarily a research technique at present. However, potential applications include functional imaging and imaging of organs poorly seen on 1H MRI (e.g., lungs and bones) or as alternative contrast agents. Inhaled hyperpolarized 3He can be used to image the distribution of air spaces within the lungs. Injectable solutions containing 13C or stabilized bubbles of hyperpolarized 129Xe have been studied as contrast agents for angiography and perfusion imaging. 31P can potentially provide information on bone density and structure, as well as functional imaging of the brain. Multinuclear imaging holds the potential to chart the distribution of lithium in the human brain, this element finding use as an important drug for those with conditions such as bipolar disorder.

Molecular imaging by MRI 

MRI has the advantages of having very high spatial resolution and is very adept at morphological imaging and functional imaging. MRI does have several disadvantages though. First, MRI has a sensitivity of around 10−3 mol/L  to 10−5 mol/L, which, compared to other types of imaging, can be very limiting. This problem stems from the fact that the population difference between the nuclear spin states is very small at room temperature. For example, at 1.5 teslas, a typical field strength for clinical MRI, the difference between high and low energy states is approximately 9 molecules per 2 million. Improvements to increase MR sensitivity include increasing magnetic field strength and hyperpolarization via optical pumping or dynamic nuclear polarization. There are also a variety of signal amplification schemes based on chemical exchange that increase sensitivity.

To achieve molecular imaging of disease biomarkers using MRI, targeted MRI contrast agents with high specificity and high relaxivity (sensitivity) are required.  To date, many studies have been devoted to developing targeted-MRI contrast agents to achieve molecular imaging by MRI.  Commonly, peptides, antibodies, or small ligands, and small protein domains, such as HER-2 affibodies, have been applied to achieve targeting. To enhance the sensitivity of the contrast agents, these targeting moieties are usually linked to high payload MRI contrast agents or MRI contrast agents with high relaxivities.  A new class of gene targeting MR contrast agents has been introduced to show gene action of unique mRNA and gene transcription factor proteins.  These new contrast agents can trace cells with unique mRNA, microRNA and virus; tissue response to inflammation in living brains. The MR reports change in gene expression with positive correlation to TaqMan analysis, optical and electron microscopy.

Parallel MRI 
It takes time to gather MRI data using sequential applications of magnetic field gradients.  Even for the most streamlined of MRI sequences, there are physical and physiologic limits to the rate of gradient switching.  Parallel MRI circumvents these limits by gathering some portion of the data simultaneously, rather than in a traditional sequential fashion.  This is accomplished using arrays of radiofrequency (RF) detector coils, each with a different 'view' of the body.  A reduced set of gradient steps is applied, and the remaining spatial information is filled in by combining signals from various coils, based on their known spatial sensitivity patterns.  The resulting acceleration is limited by the number of coils and by the signal to noise ratio (which decreases with increasing acceleration), but two- to four-fold accelerations may commonly be achieved with suitable coil array configurations, and substantially higher accelerations have been demonstrated with specialized coil arrays.  Parallel MRI may be used with most MRI sequences.

After a number of early suggestions for using arrays of detectors to accelerate imaging went largely unremarked in the MRI field, parallel imaging saw widespread development and application following the introduction of the SiMultaneous Acquisition of Spatial Harmonics (SMASH) technique in 1996–7. The SENSitivity Encoding (SENSE) and Generalized Autocalibrating Partially Parallel Acquisitions (GRAPPA) techniques are the parallel imaging methods in most common use today.  The advent of parallel MRI resulted in extensive research and development in image reconstruction and RF coil design, as well as in a rapid expansion of the number of receiver channels available on commercial MR systems.  Parallel MRI is now used routinely for MRI examinations in a wide range of body areas and clinical or research applications.

Quantitative MRI 
Most MRI focuses on qualitative interpretation of MR data by acquiring spatial maps of relative variations in signal strength which are "weighted" by certain parameters. Quantitative methods instead attempt to determine spatial maps of accurate tissue relaxometry parameter values or magnetic field, or to measure the size of certain spatial features.

Examples of quantitative MRI methods are:

 T1-mapping (notably used in cardiac magnetic resonance imaging)
 T2-mapping
 Quantitative susceptibility mapping (QSM)
 Quantitative fluid flow MRI (i.e. some cerebrospinal fluid flow MRI)
 Magnetic resonance elastography (MRE)

Quantitative MRI aims to increase the reproducibility of MR images and interpretations, but has historically require longer scan times.

Quantitative MRI (or qMRI) sometimes more specifically refers to multi-parametric quantitative MRI, the mapping of multiple tissue relaxometry parameters in a single imaging session.
Efforts to make multi-parametric quantitative MRI faster have produced sequences which map multiple parameters simultaneously, either by building separate encoding methods for each parameter into the sequence,
or by fitting MR signal evolution to a multi-parameter model.

Hyperpolarized gas MRI 

Traditional MRI generates poor images of lung tissue because there are fewer water molecules with protons that can be excited by the magnetic field. Using hyperpolarized gas an MRI scan can identify ventilation defects in the lungs.  Before the scan, a patient is asked to inhale hyperpolarized xenon mixed with a buffer gas of helium or nitrogen.  The resulting lung images are much higher quality than with tranditional MRI.

Safety

MRI is, in general, a safe technique, although injuries may occur as a result of failed safety procedures or human error. Contraindications to MRI include most cochlear implants and cardiac pacemakers, shrapnel, and metallic foreign bodies in the eyes. Magnetic resonance imaging in pregnancy appears to be safe, at least during the second and third trimesters if done without contrast agents. Since MRI does not use any ionizing radiation, its use is generally favored in preference to CT when either modality could yield the same information. Some patients experience claustrophobia and may require sedation or shorter MRI protocols. Amplitude and rapid switching of gradient coils during image acquisition may cause peripheral nerve stimulation.

MRI uses powerful magnets and can therefore cause magnetic materials to move at great speeds, posing a projectile risk, and may cause fatal accidents. However, as millions of MRIs are performed globally each year, fatalities are extremely rare.

Overuse

Medical societies issue guidelines for when physicians should use MRI on patients and recommend against overuse. MRI can detect health problems or confirm a diagnosis, but medical societies often recommend that MRI not be the first procedure for creating a plan to diagnose or manage a patient's complaint. A common case is to use MRI to seek a cause of low back pain; the American College of Physicians, for example, recommends against this procedure as unlikely to result in a positive outcome for the patient.

Artifacts

An MRI artifact is a visual artifact, that is, an anomaly during visual representation. Many different artifacts can occur during magnetic resonance imaging (MRI), some affecting the diagnostic quality, while others may be confused with pathology. Artifacts can be classified as patient-related, signal processing-dependent and hardware (machine)-related.

Non-medical use

MRI is used industrially mainly for routine analysis of chemicals. The nuclear magnetic resonance technique is also used, for example, to measure the ratio between water and fat in foods, monitoring of flow of corrosive fluids in pipes, or to study molecular structures such as catalysts.

Being non-invasive and non-damaging, MRI can be used to study the anatomy of plants, their water transportation processes and water balance. It is also applied to veterinary radiology for diagnostic purposes. Outside this, its use in zoology is limited due to the high cost; but it can be used on many species.

In palaeontology it is used to examine the structure of fossils.

Forensic imaging provides graphic documentation of an autopsy, which manual autopsy does not. CT scanning provides quick whole-body imaging of skeletal and parenchymal alterations, whereas MRI imaging gives better representation of soft tissue pathology. But MRI is more expensive, and more time-consuming to utilize. Moreover, the quality of MR imaging deteriorates below 10 °C.

History

In 1971 at Stony Brook University, Paul Lauterbur applied magnetic field gradients in all three dimensions and a back-projection technique to create NMR images. He published the first images of two tubes of water in 1973 in the journal Nature, followed by the picture of a living animal, a clam, and in 1974 by the image of the thoracic cavity of a mouse. Lauterbur called his imaging method zeugmatography, a term which was replaced by (N)MR imaging. In the late 1970s, physicists Peter Mansfield and Paul Lauterbur developed MRI-related techniques, like the echo-planar imaging (EPI) technique.

Advances in semiconductor technology were crucial to the development of practical MRI, which requires a large amount of computational power. This was made possible by the rapidly increasing number of transistors on a single integrated circuit chip. Mansfield and Lauterbur were awarded the 2003 Nobel Prize in Physiology or Medicine for their "discoveries concerning magnetic resonance imaging".

See also 

 Amplified magnetic resonance imaging
 Electron paramagnetic resonance
 High-definition fiber tracking
 High-resolution computed tomography
 History of neuroimaging
 International Society for Magnetic Resonance in Medicine
 Jemris
 List of neuroimaging software
 Magnetic immunoassay
 Magnetic particle imaging
 Magnetic resonance elastography
 Magnetic Resonance Imaging (journal)
 Magnetic resonance microscopy
 Nobel Prize controversies – Physiology or medicine
 Rabi cycle
 Robinson oscillator
 Sodium MRI
 Virtopsy

References

Further reading

External links 

 
 A Guided Tour of MRI: An introduction for laypeople National High Magnetic Field Laboratory
 The Basics of MRI. Underlying physics and technical aspects.
 Video: What to Expect During Your MRI Exam from the Institute for Magnetic Resonance Safety, Education, and Research (IMRSER)
 Royal Institution Lecture – MRI: A Window on the Human Body
 A Short History of Magnetic Resonance Imaging from a European Point of View
 How MRI works explained simply using diagrams
 Real-time MRI videos: Biomedizinische NMR Forschungs GmbH.
 Paul C. Lauterbur, Genesis of the MRI (Magnetic Resonance Imaging) notebook, September 1971 (all pages freely available for download in variety of formats from Science History Institute Digital Collections at digital.sciencehistory.org)

 
1973 introductions
20th-century inventions
American inventions
Articles containing video clips
Biomagnetics
Cryogenics
Discovery and invention controversies
Radiology